L. australis  may refer to:
 Lagenorhynchus australis, the former scientific name for Peale's dolphin (Sagmatias australis), a small dolphin species found in the waters around Tierra del Fuego at the foot of South America
 Livistona australis, the cabbage-tree palm, a plant species
 Limnohabitans australis, a planktonic freshwater bacterium affiliated with the class Betaproteobacteria and the family Comamonadaceae

See also
 Australis (disambiguation)